1955 Meistaradeildin was the 13th season of top-tier football on the Faroe Islands.

League table

Results

References
RSSSF

Meistaradeildin seasons
Faroe
Faroe